Owen Patrick Joyner (born July 19, 2000) is an American actor. He is known for playing Christian "Crispo" Powers on the 2014–2016 Nickelodeon comedy television series 100 Things to Do Before High School, and for playing Arc on the 2018–2019 Nickelodeon series Knight Squad. In 2020, he began playing the role of Alex in the Netflix series, Julie and the Phantoms.

Filmography

References

External links 
 
 

2000 births
21st-century American male actors
American male child actors
American television actors
Living people
People from Norman, Oklahoma